André Reis Lopes (born 12 September 1982) is a Portuguese volleyball player who plays for S.L. Benfica and the Portugal national team.

Honours
Benfica
Portuguese First Division: 2004–05, 2014–15, 2016–17, 2018–19
Portuguese Cup: 2004–05, 2005–06, 2006–07, 2014–15, 2015–16, 2017–18, 2018–19
Portuguese Super Cup: 2014, 2015, 2016, 2018, 2019

References

External links
 Benfica official profile 
 Player profile at Volleybox.net

1982 births
Living people
People from Seia
Portuguese men's volleyball players
Portuguese expatriates in Belgium
S.L. Benfica volleyball players
Sportspeople from Guarda District